Microsoft Train Simulator (also known as MSTS) is a 2001 train simulator developed for Microsoft Windows. It was released on May 31, 2001, and developed by UK-based company Kuju Entertainment. It sold one million units worldwide in

2005.

Features
Microsoft Train Simulator allows players to operate a selection of trains on various routes in Europe, Asia and North America. Gameplay features include players starting and stopping the train, coupling wagons, and driving the train using the computer mouse, keyboard or a hardware accessory (e.g. Raildriver) as controls.

Route
The game featured six routes in four countries: Austria, Japan, the United Kingdom and the United States of America. Four of the routes use a standard gauge and two a  Gauge.

Reception

Sales
Train Simulator sold 191,952 units in the United States by the end of 2001, which drew revenues of $8.7 million. These numbers rose to 330,000 copies ($11.6 million) in the United States by August 2006. At the time, this led Edge to rank it as the country's 54th-best-selling computer game released since January 2000.

Internationally, Train Simulator received a "Silver" sales award from the Entertainment and Leisure Software Publishers Association (ELSPA), indicating sales of at least 100,000 copies in the United Kingdom. In the German market, the Verband der Unterhaltungssoftware Deutschland (VUD) presented it with a "Gold" certification in early 2003, for sales of at least 100,000 units across Germany, Austria and Switzerland.

Train Simulator ultimately sold one million units by 2005, and, despite its age, is still very popular and has a large, active community.

Reviews and awards
John Lee reviewed the PC version of the game for Next Generation, rating it four stars out of five, and stated that "All aboard for HO scale fans, train spotters, and nostalgic rail buffs. Train haters, however, may prefer the old cliché, 'Run for the roadhouse, boys. They can't corner you there.'"

The Academy of Interactive Arts & Sciences nominated Microsoft Train Simulator for its 2001 "Computer Simulation Game of the Year" award, which ultimately went to Microsoft Flight Simulator 2002.

Mods
The game also included a route and activity editor that enabled users to create and modify routes, trains and activities. The game also allowed for mod support to add and change routes, trains, cargo, scenery, etc. Over 1,000 mods were created for the game and are mostly hosted on community sites such as trainsim.com, uktrainsim.com and elvastower.com. Additionally, MSTS BIN, a community mod aimed at adding features and fixing old MSTS bugs, has since been released.

Cancelled sequel

On May 7, 2003, Microsoft announced that it would be developing a sequel called Microsoft Train Simulator 2; it was first demoed to the public at E3 on May 15. Seemingly, its main improvements were the addition of people to the game (e.g. passengers waiting at the stations, people operating the new locomotive roster, etc.), and turntables. It was being developed by Kuju Entertainment, the original MSTS creators. Despite restructuring efforts at Kuju, the project was handed over to Microsoft Game Studios on August 18, 2003.

This project was ultimately halted, as the following statement on April 24, 2004, from Microsoft confirmed:

On January 19, 2007, Microsoft announced the relaunch of the Microsoft Train Simulator project. This time the game was being developed in-house by Aces Game Studio (Microsoft Game Studios) known for its long line of Microsoft Flight Simulators, as a part of the "Games for Windows" initiative. The game would have used the Microsoft Flight Simulator X graphics engine, and it was planned to be compatible with both Windows Vista and Windows XP. A post on “The Little Wheel Goes in Back” blog, written by one of the developers, on August 23, 2007, suggested the working title was “Train Simulator 2”.

On January 23, 2009, Microsoft announced that it was permanently closing Aces Game Studios, the internal development studio responsible for the Microsoft Flight Simulator series and the development of Microsoft Train Simulator 2. As a result, all future development on Train Simulator 2 (which was entering the final stages of development at the time of the closure) was immediately halted, marking the second time that the project was terminated. While Microsoft stated that "they are committed to both the Flight Simulator and Train Simulator brands", it is unknown if the Train Simulator 2 project will ever be resurrected and completed in the future. However, because they discontinued support for Windows XP in 2014 and Windows Vista in 2017 (the two operating systems the second attempt was to be compatible with), as well as the Games for Windows initiative discontinued in 2013, it seems unlikely.

Many former employees of Aces Game Studios went on to join Cascade Game Foundry, a new company that was founded by two Aces alumni. Cascade Game Foundry focuses on developing entertainment simulations.

Open-sourcing  

MSTS content is compatible with the open source train simulator project Open Rails. Open Rails boasts the largest collection of digital content in the world thanks to the following of MSTS. Hope of developing MSTS further ended in 2009; however, the support for third party DLC that MSTS provided gave Open Rails a community engaged with the topic. Open Rails uses the GPL license. Open Rails is now moving on from providing legacy support for MSTS to adding new features.  Open Rails uses modern graphics processors. This allows Open Rails to achieve better frame rates than MSTS.

A fork of Open Rails has been used in several studies about real life operation of railroads, for example a 2016 study analyzing the impact of cyberattacks on railroads.

References

External links
 
 

2001 video games
Microsoft games
Microsoft Train Simulator
Train simulation video games
Video games developed in the United Kingdom
Windows games
Windows-only games